Kenneth Bogner is an American politician from the state of Montana. He is a member of the Montana Senate, representing the 19th district.

Early life and career
Bogner served in the United States Marine Corps as a combat engineer. He completed two tours of duty in the Middle East during the Iraq War. After he completed his military service, Bogner utilized the G.I. Bill to earn his bachelor's degree in political science from Columbia University. He also earned a Master of Public Policy from Middlesex University. He returned to Montana and served as chief of staff for the majority leader of the Montana Senate and then as a field representative for Steve Daines.

Montana State Legislature
Bogner was elected to the Montana Senate in 2018. Albert Olszewski selected Bogner as his running mate in the 2020 Montana gubernatorial election.

2018 Montana Senate election

References

External links

1987 births
21st-century American politicians
Alumni of Middlesex University
Columbia College (New York) alumni
Living people
Political chiefs of staff
Republican Party Montana state senators
United States Marines